Dong, or Donga, is a poorly documented language in Nigeria. Though clearly Niger–Congo, it is difficult to classify; British linguist Roger Blench proposes that it is one of the Dakoid languages, the closest to Gaa.

References

Bibliography 
Blench, Roger (n.d.) 'The Dɔ̃ (Dong) language and its affinities'. Ms. circulated at the 27th Colloquium on African Languages and Linguistics, Leiden, 1994.
Blench, Roger (2008) 'Prospecting proto-Plateau'. Manuscript.
 Blench, Roger (2011) 'The membership and internal structure of Bantoid and the border with Bantu'. Bantu IV, Humboldt University, Berlin.

Northern Bantoid languages
Languages of Nigeria